Malqeshlaqi (also Romanized as Mālqeshlāqī; also known as Māl Qeshlāq) is a village in Angut-e Gharbi Rural District, Anguti District, Germi County, Ardabil Province, Iran. At the 2006 census, its population was 28, in 6 families.

References 

Towns and villages in Germi County